Large format lenses are photographic optics that provide an image circle large enough to cover the large format film or plates used in large format cameras.  

Photographic optics generally project a circular image behind that is only required to have acceptable correction of aberrations over the intended film/sensor diagonal with little room to spare. Lenses that may be able to produce a considerably larger image circle than is needed (notably long focus lenses), but optimised for a given image format will typically mask this excess coverage off to minimize reflections and reduced contrast.

However, Some Medium and Large format cameras have movements, such as view cameras also sometimes known as technical cameras. Allowing the lens to be shifted and/or tilted from the sensor/film axis without vignetting in the corners opposite the movement requires a larger image circle. For this reason, large format lenses often produce image circles significantly larger than the film/sensor diagonal they are nominally aimed at
 
Compared to mainstream cameras that typically have non-interchangeable lenses and/or focal plane shutters operated from the camera body, another difference with medium and especially large format lenses is that they are typically interchangeable in a very simple manner, being mounted in a "lens board", and include a shutter just in front behind or usually in the middle of the lens. This shutter is tripped directly at the lens (possibly using a cable release), not by a release on the camera body

Lens designs
Note: much of the text in this section is applicable to camera lenses for all formats, not only large format lenses

Lenses of the same general construction are often given a name implying this design. For example, a Tessar always has four elements in three groups as described below, although Tessars have been produced with different focal lengths and maximum apertures for many decades. Sometimes a name does not identify a specific design; Kodak's Ektar lens brand name encompasses many different types. Sometimes different manufacturers use different names for lenses of the same type; for example, the Voigtländer Skopar is of Tessar design. And sometimes identical lenses are sold under different names and at different prices; for example, lenses branded as Rodenstock and Calder.

Early lenses suffered from flare and low contrast, worsening as the number of lens-air interfaces increased. The introduction of and improvements in anti-reflective coatings vastly reduced flare; some many-element lens designs which had been abandoned due to low contrast in spite of otherwise excellent performance became practical.
Lenses designed for use with monochromatic film, first orthochromatic, then panchromatic, had less exacting requirements regarding chromatic aberrations than when colour film is used. When using older lenses today one should check those chromatic aberrations and flare are acceptable for the application.

Wide-angle lens designs
The term wide-angle lens denotes a lens that has an image circle diameter significantly wider than the lens focal length

The Hypergon is a wide angle lens that covers a flat field. It is constructed symmetrically consisting of two deep meniscus elements that almost form a sphere. The aperture is limited to f/20 due to spherical and chromatic aberrations.

The Topogon is a double Gauss design arranged in a symmetrical design. Due to its wide-angle coverage, and the small distortion, it and the Metrogon became the standard aerial lens until it was displaced in 1952.

 
The Hologon is a modification of the Biogon lens design. It contains a rear element that is close to film plane for better contrast but interferes with the mirror for SLR. There is significant light falloff at the edges, so it is frequently used with ND center graduated filters.

The Biogon is an ultra-wide-angle design by Ludwig Bertele based on a double-ended reversed-telephoto objective. It was made by Zeiss for their 35mm Contax and the medium-format Hasselblad cameras. The design was physically large, being two focal lengths in length and one focal length in diameter.  There are two menisci at the front and a single strong meniscus element at the rear. The rear element is close to the film plane for low distortion and better contrast but interferes with the mirror on a single-lens reflex camera.

The Goerz Dagor has two symmetrical, cemented triplets (6 elements in 2 groups). The two outer elements are positive, one of the inner elements is used to correct spherical aberration, and the other to flatten the field. There are only 4 glass-to-air interfaces, giving better flare and contrast than lenses with more elements, particularly important before the introduction of coated lenses. Reputed to have good sharpness and a large image circle, although there is softness at the edges.

Normal lens designs
The term wide-angle lens denotes a lens that has an image circle diameter approximately the same as the lens focal length

Anastigmat is an achromatic lens used to reduce or eliminate astigmatism designed specifically for photographic applications. All modern lenses are anastigmatic; lenses produced in the early days when this was a new feature often had the word Anastigmat in their name: Voigtländer Anastigmat Skopar.
A Tessar comprises four elements in three groups, one positive crown glass element on the front, one negative flint glass element at the center, and a negative plano-concave flint glass element cemented with a positive convex crown glass element at the rear. Many manufacturers have produced lenses of this type under their own names. 
The Tessar design is suitable for front-element focussing, but unit focussing is used on large format cameras.

The Heliar design consists of 5 elements in three groups with cemented doublets, allowing correction of spherical, chromatic, and astigmatic aberrations.

 A Planar design is one with 4 groups of 6 elements and a flat field design. Its symmetrical optical configuration produces low spherical aberration and astigmatism. The design was not widely used until coating processes were available, due to the very low contrast caused by light loss from a large number of transmission surfaces.

The Sonnar design originally had six elements, later seven, in three groups. The design uses fewer elements than the Planar design and is smaller and less expensive. It has more aberrations but better contrast and less flare than the Planar, a larger maximum aperture, and lower chromatic aberration than the Tessar. Large format Sonnars have good sharpness and contrast at large apertures but are large and heavy, and coverage does not allow much use of movements. The Sonnar has a good edge contrast at all apertures, but some softness at wide apertures.

The Artar is a true apochromatic 4-element in 4 groups symmetrical process lens for the graphic arts, very well corrected for other aberrations. It was designed by Walter Zschokke of Goerz in 1904, based on Emile Von Hoegh's dialyte. If uncoated it is subject to flare due to the 8 air-to-glass surfaces.

Telephoto lens designs
The term long-focus lens denotes a lens that has a focal length significantly longer than the image circle diameter. For small formats such as 35mm, extreme long focus lenses can be found, with focal lengths 5, 10, or even higher multiples of the image circle, however, such extreme lenses are not normal for large formats (unless we chose to consider astronomical telescopes as cameras, which is very valid, indeed see eg Schmitt cameras and astrographs)
The term telephoto has become widely if loosely used for any long-focus lens, but a true telephoto lens is designed to be physically shorter* than a simple lens of that long focal length. Typically this is achieved with a diverging group (sometimes known as the telephoto group) between the converging front group and the film/sensor. As a bonus, this rear diverging group often acts to flatten the focal plane (that would result from spherical aberrations of the front group if not corrected)

the front group is further back relative to the lens node/focal plane than would be the case for a simple thin lens of the same focal length

See also
List of lens designs
Large Format

References

External links
Artar lens PDF(de)
 A Short History of the Heliar Lenses
 Large Format: Wide Angle Lens Specifications 
 Kerry's Large Format Homepage
 Large Format Lenses: Evaluations By Bjørn Rørslett
 Test Results - Large Format photographic lenses
 Exploring Large Format Camera Technique
 Large-Format Lens Specifications
 How to Mount Large Format Lenses on DSLR Camera

Photographic lenses